Maxstoke railway station opened in 1839 as Coleshill  by the Birmingham and Derby Junction Railway on its original route from Derby to Hampton-in-Arden meeting the London and Birmingham Railway for London.

History
When the BD&JR built its alternative route in Lawley Street in 1842, the line, known as the Stonebridge Railway, lost its importance and the passenger service finished in 1917.

It was renamed Maxstoke in 1923 (while Forge Mills became Coleshill)

Freight services continued until 30 April 1939. The track was removed soon after and the station was demolished.

On 24 February 2014, a local volunteer from Birmingham, with the full permission of local farmer John Plum, began uncovering the platform fascia and brickwork.

Stationmasters
P. Gibson ca. 1859, ca. 1866
Frederick Freeman
William Barber ca. 1868
F. Turner until 1873
F. Swinnerton 1873 - 1877
William Reynolds 1877 - 1887 (formerly station master at Hellifield)
Charles Wells 1887 - 1908
William L. Leary 1908 - ca. 1912

References

Clinker. C. R.,  (1982) The Birmingham and Derby Junction Railway, Avon-AngliA Publications and Services.
Whishaw, F., (1840) The Railways of Great Britain and Ireland: Practically described and illustrated London: Simpkin, Marshall and Co.

External links
 This station's entry on Warwickshirerailways.com
Rail Around Birmingham and the West Midlands: Coleshill station

Disused railway stations in Warwickshire
Railway stations in Great Britain opened in 1839
Railway stations in Great Britain closed in 1917
Former Midland Railway stations
Coleshill, Warwickshire